Carlos Andrés Gómez Hinestroza (born 12 September 2002) is a Colombian professional footballer who plays for Real Salt Lake in Major League Soccer.

Career
A right winger, his professional debut for Millonarios shirt came on 14 November 2021 in a game against Alianza Petrolera. His first Millonarios goal was on 1 May 2022 against Patriotas Boyacá. In September 2022 Gomez signed a new contract with the club lasting into 2025. His form helped his club qualify for the Copa Libertadores by winning the 2022 Copa Colombia. Goméz was thought to be moving to Brazil in December 2022 to Red Bull Bragantino but the transfer fell through repeatedly due to disagreements over the financial structure of the deal.

On 10 January 2023, Gómez signed with Major League Soccer side Real Salt Lake on a five-year deal.

Honours
Millonarios
Copa Colombia: 2022

References

Living people
2002 births
Colombian footballers
Colombian expatriate footballers
Colombian expatriate sportspeople in the United States
Millonarios F.C. players
Real Salt Lake players